Internet Explorer (formerly Microsoft Internet Explorer and Windows Internet Explorer, commonly abbreviated IE or MSIE) is a series of graphical web browsers developed by Microsoft and included as part of the Microsoft Windows line of operating systems, starting in 1995.

The first version of Internet Explorer, (at that time named Microsoft Internet Explorer, later referred to as Internet Explorer 1) made its debut on August 24, 1995. It was a reworked version of Spyglass Mosaic, which Microsoft licensed from Spyglass Inc., like many other companies initiating browser development. It was first released as part of the add-on package Plus! for Windows 95 that year. Later versions were available as free downloads, or in service packs, and included in the OEM service releases of Windows 95 and later versions of Windows.

Originally Microsoft Internet Explorer only ran on Windows using Intel 80386 (IA-32) processor. Current versions also run on x64, 32-bit ARMv7, PowerPC and IA-64. Versions on Windows have supported MIPS, Alpha AXP and 16-bit and 32-bit x86 but currently support only 32-bit or 64-bit. A version exists for Xbox 360 called Internet Explorer for Xbox using PowerPC and an embedded OEM version called Pocket Internet Explorer, later rebranded Internet Explorer Mobile, which is currently based on Internet Explorer 9 and made for Windows Phone using ARMv7, Windows CE, and previously, based on Internet Explorer 7 for Windows Mobile. It remains in development alongside the desktop versions.

Internet Explorer has supported other operating systems with Internet Explorer for Mac (using Motorola 68020+, PowerPC) and Internet Explorer for UNIX (Solaris using SPARC and HP-UX using PA-RISC), which have been discontinued.

Since its first release, Microsoft has added features and technologies such as basic table display (in version 1.5); XMLHttpRequest (in version 5), which adds creation of dynamic web pages; and Internationalized Domain Names (in version 7), which allow Web sites to have native-language addresses with non-Latin characters. The browser has also received scrutiny throughout its development for use of third-party technology (such as the source code of Spyglass Mosaic, used without royalty in early versions) and security and privacy vulnerabilities, and both the United States and the European Union have alleged that integration of Internet Explorer with Windows has been to the detriment of other browsers.

The latest stable release has an interface allowing for use as both a desktop application, and as a Windows 8 application.

OS compatibility

IE versions, over time, have had widely varying OS compatibility, ranging from being available for many platforms and several versions of Windows to only a few versions of Windows. Many versions of IE had some support for an older OS but stopped getting updates. The increased growth of the Internet in the 1990s and 2000s means that current browsers with small market shares have more total users than the entire market early on. For example, 90% market share in 1997 would be roughly 60 million users, but by the start of 2007 90% market share would equate to over 900 million users. The result is that later versions of IE6 had many more users in total than all the early versions put together.

The release of IE7 at the end of 2006 resulted in a collapse of IE6 market share; by February 2007, market version share statistics showed IE6 at about 50% and IE7 at 29%. Regardless of the actual market share, the most compatible version (across operating systems) of IE was 5.x, which had Mac OS 9 and Mac OS X, Unix, and most Windows versions available and supported for a short period in the late 1990s (although 4.x had a more unified codebase across versions). By 2007, IE had much narrower OS support, with the latest versions supporting only Windows XP Service Pack 2 and above.  Internet Explorer 5.0, 5.5, 6.0, and 7.0 (Experimental) have also been unofficially ported to the Linux operating system from the project IEs4Linux.

Versions

Microsoft Internet Explorer 1.x

Microsoft Internet Explorer 1.0 made its debut on August 24, 1995. It was a reworked version of Spyglass Mosaic which Microsoft had licensed, like many other companies initiating browser development, from Spyglass Inc. It came with the purchase of Microsoft Plus! for Windows 95 and with at least some OEM releases of Windows 95 without Plus!. It was installed as part of the Internet Jumpstart Kit in Plus! for Windows 95. The Internet Explorer team began with about six people in early development. Microsoft Internet Explorer 1.5 was released several months later for Windows NT and added support for basic HTML table rendering. By including it free of charge on their operating system, they did not have to pay royalties to Spyglass Inc, resulting in a lawsuit and a US$8 million settlement on January 22, 1997.

Although not included, this software can also be installed on the original release of Windows 95.

Microsoft Internet Explorer (that is version 1.x) is no longer supported, or available for download from Microsoft. However, archived versions of the software can be found on various websites. Support for Internet Explorer 1.0 Ended on December 31, 2001, same day as Windows 95 and older Windows Versions.

Features
Microsoft Internet Explorer came with an install routine replacing a manual installation required by many of the existing web browsers.

Microsoft Internet Explorer 2

Microsoft Internet Explorer 2 was released for Windows 95, Windows NT 3.51, and NT 4.0 on November 22, 1995 (following a 2.0 beta in October). It featured support for JavaScript, SSL, cookies, frames, VRML, RSA, and Internet newsgroups. Version 2 was also the first release for Windows 3.1 and Macintosh System 7.0.1 (PPC or 68k), although the Mac version was not released until January 1996 for PPC, and April for 68k. Version 2.1 for the Mac came out in August 1996, although by this time, Windows was getting 3.0. Version 2 was included in Windows 95 OSR 1 and Microsoft's Internet Starter Kit for Windows 95 in early 1996. It launched with twelve languages, including English, but by April 1996, this was expanded to 24, 20, and 9 for Win 95, Win 3.1, and Mac, respectively. The 2.0i version supported double-byte character-set.

Microsoft Internet Explorer 3

Microsoft Internet Explorer 3 was released on August 13, 1996 and went on to be much more popular than its predecessors. Microsoft Internet Explorer 3 was the first major browser with CSS support, although this support was only partial. It also introduced support for ActiveX controls, Java applets, inline multimedia, and the PICS system for content metadata. Version 3 also came bundled with Internet Mail and News, NetMeeting, and an early version of the Windows Address Book, and was itself included with Windows 95 OSR 2. Version 3 proved to be the first more popular version of Internet Explorer, bringing with it increased scrutiny. In the months following its release, a number of security and privacy vulnerabilities were found by researchers and hackers. This version of Internet Explorer was the first to have the 'blue e' logo. The Internet Explorer team consisted of roughly 100 people during the development of three months. The first major IE security hole, the Princeton Word Macro Virus Loophole, was discovered on August 22, 1996 in IE3.

Backwards compatibility was handled by allowing users who upgraded to IE3 to still use the previous version, because the installation renamed the old version (incorporating the old version number) and stored it in the same directory.

Microsoft Internet Explorer 4

Microsoft Internet Explorer 4, released in September 1997, deepened the level of integration between the web browser and the underlying operating system. Installing version 4 on Windows 95 or Windows NT 4.0 and choosing Windows Desktop Update would result in the traditional Windows Explorer being replaced by a version more akin to a web browser interface, as well as the Windows desktop itself being web-enabled via Active Desktop. The integration with Windows, however, was subject to numerous packaging criticisms (see United States v. Microsoft). This option was no longer available with the installers for later versions of Internet Explorer, but was not removed from the system if already installed. Microsoft Internet Explorer 4 introduced support for Group Policy, allowing companies to configure and lock down many aspects of the browser's configuration as well as support for offline browsing. Internet Mail and News was replaced with Outlook Express, and Microsoft Chat and an improved NetMeeting were also included. This version was also included with Windows 98. New features that allowed users to save and retrieve posts in comment forms were added, but they are not used today. Microsoft Internet Explorer 4.5 offered new features such as easier 128-bit encryption. It also offered a dramatic stability improvement over prior versions, particularly the 68k version, which was especially prone to freezing.

Microsoft Internet Explorer 5

Microsoft Internet Explorer 5, launched on March 18, 1999, and subsequently included with Windows 98 Second Edition and bundled with Office 2000, was another significant release that supported bi-directional text, ruby characters, XML, XSLT, and the ability to save web pages in MHTML format. IE5 was bundled with Outlook Express 5. Also, with the release of Microsoft Internet Explorer 5.0, Microsoft released the first version of XMLHttpRequest, giving birth to Ajax (even though the term "Ajax" was not coined until years later). It was the last with a 16-bit version. Microsoft Internet Explorer 5.01, a bug fix version included in Windows 2000, was released in December 1999 and it is the last version of Internet Explorer to run on Windows 3.1x and Windows NT 3.51. Microsoft Internet Explorer 5.5 followed in June 2000, improving its print preview capabilities, CSS and HTML standards support, and developer APIs; this version was bundled with Windows ME. However, version 5 was the last version for Mac and UNIX. Version 5.5 was the last to have Compatibility Mode, which allowed Microsoft Internet Explorer 4 to be run side by side with the 5.x series. Version 5.5 is also the last version of Internet Explorer to run on Windows 95 and all Windows NT 4.0 versions newer than SP2, but except SP6a. The next version, Internet Explorer 6, will only support Windows NT 4.0 SP6a or later.

Microsoft Internet Explorer 6

Microsoft Internet Explorer 6 was released on August 24, 2001, a few months before Windows XP. This version included DHTML enhancements, content restricted inline frames, and partial support of CSS level 1, DOM level 1, and SMIL 2.0. The MSXML engine was also updated to version 3.0. Other new features included a new version of the Internet Explorer Administration Kit (IEAK), Media bar, Windows Messenger integration, fault collection, automatic image resizing, P3P, and a new look-and-feel that was in line with the Luna visual style of Windows XP, when used in Windows XP. Internet Explorer 6.0 SP1, which offered several security enhancements, coincided with the Windows XP SP1 patch release and it is the last version of Internet Explorer compatible with Windows NT 4.0, Windows 98, Windows 2000 and Windows Me. In 2002, the Gopher protocol was disabled, and support for it was dropped in Internet Explorer 7. Internet Explorer 6.0 SV1 came out on August 6, 2004 for Windows XP SP2 and offered various security enhancements and new colour buttons on the user interface.  Internet Explorer 6 updated the original 'blue e' logo to a lighter blue and more 3D look. Microsoft now considers IE6 to be an obsolete product and recommends that users upgrade to Internet Explorer 8. Some corporate IT users have not upgraded despite this, in part because some still use Windows 2000, which will not run Internet Explorer 7 or above. Microsoft has launched a website, https://web.archive.org/web/20110304205645/http://ie6countdown.com/, with the goal of getting Internet Explorer 6 usage to drop below 1 percent worldwide. Its usage is 6% globally as of October 2012, and now about 6.3% since June 2013, and depending on the country, the usage differs heavily: while the usage in Norway is 0.1%, it is 21.3% in the People's Republic of China. On January 3, 2012, Microsoft announced that usage of IE6 in the United States had dropped below 1%.

Windows Internet Explorer 7

Windows Internet Explorer 7 was released on October 18, 2006. It includes bug fixes, enhancements to its support for web standards, tabbed browsing with tab preview and management, a multiple-engine search box, a web feeds reader, Internationalized Domain Name support (IDN), Extended Validation Certificate support, and an anti-phishing filter. With IE7, Internet Explorer has been decoupled from the Windows Shell—unlike previous versions, the Internet Explorer ActiveX control is not hosted in the Windows Explorer process, but rather runs in a separate Internet Explorer process. It is included with Windows Vista and Windows Server 2008, and is available for Windows XP Service Pack 2 and later, and Windows Server 2003 Service Pack 1 and later. It is the last version of Internet Explorer to run on Windows Server 2003 SP1, as the next version, Internet Explorer 8, runs only on Windows Server 2003 SP2. The original release of Internet Explorer 7 required the computer to pass a Windows Genuine Advantage validation check prior to installing, but on October 5, 2007, Microsoft removed this requirement. As some statistics show, by mid-2008, Internet Explorer 7 market share exceeded that of Internet Explorer 6 in a number of regions.

Windows Internet Explorer 8

Windows Internet Explorer 8 was released on March 19, 2009. It is the first version of IE to pass the Acid2 test, and the last of the major browsers to do so (in the later Acid3 Test, it only scores 24/100.). According to Microsoft, security, ease of use, and improvements in RSS, CSS, and Ajax support were its priorities for IE8.

Internet Explorer 8 is the last version of Internet Explorer to support Windows XP, Windows Server 2003, Windows XP Professional x64 Edition, the x64 versions of Windows Server 2003, Windows Vista before SP2 and Windows Server 2008 before SP2; the following version, Internet Explorer 9, works only on Windows Vista SP2 or later and Windows Server 2008 SP2 or later. Support for Internet Explorer 8 is bound to the lifecycle of the Windows version it is installed on as it is considered an OS component, thus it is unsupported on Windows XP due to the end of extended support for the latter in April 2014. Effective January 12, 2016, Internet Explorer 8 is no longer supported on any client or server version of Windows, due to new policies specifying that only the newest version of IE available for a supported version of Windows will be supported. However several Windows Embedded versions will remain supported until their respective EOL, unless otherwise specified.

Windows Internet Explorer 9 

Windows Internet Explorer 9 was released on March 14, 2011. Development for Internet Explorer 9 began shortly after the release of Internet Explorer 8. Microsoft first announced Internet Explorer 9 at PDC 2009, and spoke mainly about how it takes advantage of hardware acceleration in DirectX to improve the performance of web applications and quality of web typography. At MIX 10, Microsoft showed and publicly released the first Platform Preview for Internet Explorer 9, a frame for IE9's engine not containing any UI of the browser. Leading up to the release of the final browser, Microsoft released updated platform previews, each featuring improved JavaScript compiling (32-bit version), improved scores on the Acid3 test, as well as additional HTML5 standards support, approximately every six weeks. Ultimately, eight platform previews were released. The first public beta was released at a special event in San Francisco, which was themed around "the beauty of the web". The release candidate was released on February 10, 2011, and featured improved performance, refinements to the UI, and further standards support. The final version was released during the South by Southwest (SXSW) Interactive conference in Austin, Texas, on March 14, 2011.

Internet Explorer 9 is only supported on Windows Vista, Windows 7, Windows Server 2008, and Windows Server 2008 R2. It is the last version of Internet Explorer to support Windows Vista, Windows Server 2008, Windows 7 below SP1, Windows Server 2008 R2 below SP1 and Windows Phone 7.5; as the next version, Internet Explorer 10 supports only Windows 7 SP1 or later and Windows Server 2008 R2 SP1 or later. It supports several CSS 3 properties (including border-radius, box-shadow, etc.), and embedded ICC v2 or v4 colour profiles support via Windows Color System. The 32-bit version has faster JavaScript performance, this being due to a new JavaScript engine called "Chakra". It also features hardware accelerated graphics rendering using Direct2D, hardware-accelerated text rendering using DirectWrite, hardware-accelerated video rendering using Media Foundation, imaging support provided by Windows Imaging Component, and high fidelity printing powered by the XPS print pipeline. IE9 also supports the HTML5 video and audio tags and the Web Open Font Format. Internet Explorer 9 initially scored 95/100 on the Acid3 test, but has scored 100/100 since the test was updated in September 2011.

Internet Explorer was to be omitted from Windows 7 and Windows Server 2008 R2 in Europe, but Microsoft ultimately included it, with a browser option screen allowing users to select any of several web browsers (including Internet Explorer).

Internet Explorer is now available on Xbox 360 with Kinect support, as of October 2012.

Internet Explorer 10

Internet Explorer 10 became generally available on October 26, 2012, alongside Windows 8 and Windows Server 2012, but is by now supported on Windows Server 2012, while Windows Server 2012 R2 only supports Internet Explorer 11. It became available for Windows 7 on February 26, 2013. Microsoft announced Internet Explorer 10 in April 2011, at MIX 11 in Las Vegas, releasing the first Platform Preview at the same time. At the show, it was said that Internet Explorer 10 was about three weeks in development. This release further improves upon standards support, including HTML5 Drag & Drop and CSS3 gradients. Internet Explorer 10 drops support for Windows Vista and will only run on Windows 7 Service Pack 1 and later.
Internet Explorer 10 Release Preview was also released on the Windows 8 Release Preview platform.

Internet Explorer 11

Internet Explorer 11 is featured in a Windows 8.1 update which was released on October 17, 2013. It includes an incomplete mechanism for syncing tabs. It features a major update to its developer tools, enhanced scaling for high DPI screens, HTML5 prerender and prefetch, hardware-accelerated JPEG decoding, closed captioning, HTML5 full screen, and is the first Internet Explorer to support WebGL and Google's protocol SPDY (starting at v3). This version of IE has features dedicated to Windows 8.1, including cryptography (WebCrypto), adaptive bitrate streaming (Media Source Extensions) and Encrypted Media Extensions.

Internet Explorer 11 was made available for Windows 7 users to download on November 7, 2013, with Automatic Updates in the following weeks.

Internet Explorer 11's user agent string now identifies the agent as "Trident" (the underlying browser engine) instead of "MSIE". It also announces compatibility with Gecko (the browser engine of Firefox).

Microsoft claimed that Internet Explorer 11, running the WebKit SunSpider JavaScript Benchmark, was the fastest browser as of October 15, 2013.

Since January 12, 2016, only the most recent version of Internet Explorer offered for installation on any given Windows operating system is supported with security updates, lasting until the end of the support lifecycle for that Windows operating system. On Windows 7 and 8.1, only Internet Explorer 11 received security updates until the end of those Windows versions' support lifecycles. Support for Internet Explorer 11 is bound to the lifecycle of the Windows version it is installed on as it is considered an OS component, thus it is unsupported on Windows 7 due to the end of extended support on January 14, 2020. Internet Explorer 11 was made available for Windows Server 2012 and Windows Embedded 8 Standard, the only still supported edition of Windows 8 in April 2019. It is the only supported version of Internet Explorer on these operating systems since January 31, 2020.

Internet Explorer 11 follows the OS component lifecycle, which means it remains supported with technical and security fixes while operating systems including it as a component are shipped. This means that there is no date for end of support for Internet Explorer 11. On August 17, 2020, Microsoft published a timeline indicating that the Microsoft Teams product would stop supporting Internet Explorer 11 on November 30, 2020, and Microsoft 365 products ended support for Internet Explorer 11 on August 17, 2021. In May 2021, Microsoft announced that support for Internet Explorer 11 on editions of Windows 10 that are not in the Long-Term Servicing Channel (LTSC) would end on June 15, 2022. Internet Explorer 11 was thought to not be on Windows 11, Windows Server Insider Build 22463 and Windows Server Insider Build 25110 as a separate application - however, a few people managed to access it, through the question mark in the Internet Options window. However, while the browser itself is no longer supported, it is supported as IE mode in Edge, including on Windows 11, Windows Server Insider Build 22463 and Windows Server Insider Build 25110. Microsoft has said that it will maintain support for this feature until 2029 at the earliest, and that it will provide one year's notice before its discontinuation. IE mode uses the Trident MSHTML engine.

Release history for desktop Windows OS version

 Service packs are not included unless significant.

See also
 Internet Explorer
 Features of Internet Explorer
 History of Internet Explorer

References

Further reading

 
 
 
 

Internet Explorer
Software version histories